U-Vistract is a pyramid scheme created by Noah Musingku in Papua New Guinea (PNG) around 1999 as a means of providing a sovereign wealth source for an independent Bougainville. Eventually, it was established, and expelled, from Australia, PNG, Solomon Islands, but continues to exist in some form in the island Bougainville under the rule of Musingku as King David Peii II.

Description
U-Vistract is considered by many to be a Ponzi scheme. The founders have stated that the plan has always been to back the assets of the plan with the in-ground natural resources, including copper, silver, gold, zinc and other products.

Formation of U-Vistract
In 1997, seven years after the unilateral declaration of independence, the Bougainville Revolutionary Army was fully in control of the island, but its leadership was starting to split into different factions. Francis Ona continued in full control of the army, and intended to achieve full independence. His co-president in the Bougainville Interim Government, Joseph Kabui, was seeking rapprochement with PNG and formation of an Autonomous Bougainville Government, while the army General Sam Kauona had his own path. Musingku met with each of them as a mediator, and by 19 December had signed agreements with each. They realized that it would be impossible to join the three parties together without a source of funding, and that it would be impossible to achieve political independence without financial sovereignty. As Musingku’s wrote,

’'In other words, Bougainville needed to create her own independent and sovereign system in order to be free from the control of the other international financial and governing structure. Also, it was very clear that the funds we needed to work with in uprooting, pulling down, destroying and overthrowing the existing foreign control system could not be earned through the conventional system. A new international system needed to be established whose control and coordination would not be based overseas but right here on our own soil.'’

Thus began the creation of the U-Vistract System. At first, the "U-Vistract Mission" was established as a Christian mission program in Australia. After Musingku was arrested and publicly denigrated by the Australian Securities and Investments Commission (ASIC) for an unlicensed securities and investment program, churches continued to invest.

"On October 19th 1999 in one of my trips to Australia the ASIC placed me under house-arrest….After a heavy interrogatory session they demanded me to shut down all my operations in the country. The ASIC publicized the matter in the media to let the world of Australia know about the so-called illegal operations. However, U-Vistract grew even stronger, gaining momentum almost overnight. The number of my agencies grew in Kempsey, Sydney, Brisbane, Gold coast, etc."

From Australia, Musingku took his U-Vistract program to Pt Moresby, Papua New Guinea. While in Pt Moresby, he attempted to set up a bank in the old Hawaiian Bank building, but he was shut down by the PNG government and forced to leave to the Solomon Islands. He began again to set up his system, but the Australian police in the Regional Assistance Mission to Solomon Islands (RAMSI) forced him out. In 2003 he travelled to Ona’s headquarters in Guava, Panguna, Bougainville, and established a bank there. Two years later he was able to travel to his ancestral village of Tonu, where he established his bank headquarters in an old cattle farm owned by the paramount chief. This, he said, was the manger from which would issue salvation of the world.

Throughout the process we were on the lookout for an ideal government that would allow us to fit our system into it without unnecessary restrictions, terms or conditions. Our search around the world could not locate any such government. 
The answer was right here on Bougainville. However, it could not be the Autonomous government as she was already defiled with a foreign partner. Meekamui was clearly the only one that fitted our descriptions and expectations.

All other governments including Australia, PNG, Solomon Islands, etc, could not fit into this description as they already had other software programs <ref  fitted into them. Australia repelled us in 2000. PNG pushed us out in 1999 and again in 2002.

Expansion
The PNG government under advice from its foreign controllers such as the World Bank and International Monetary Fund had tried everything possible to block our way forward,

Others merely saw us as nobodies, pyramid schemes, conmen, and cargo/religious cults, etc. They did not realize that we were busy growing and extending our branches around the world, establishing a new international system of governance, monetary and banking.

U-V was established in several countries besides Bougainville. In 2002, it was already in 4 nations, including PNG. Its branches were considered to be branches of a government, with governors of different districts and regions in foreign nations. Along with a system of banks, branches and governorships in several countries, U-Vistract established an "alternate UN" called ‘’'Royal Assembly of Nations and Kingdoms'’’. Emissaries were sent from U-Vistract and RAONK to several nations, including Papua New Guinea, Fiji, Solomon Islands, the UK and Netherlands.

Implementation and operation
Initially, deposits were made in several currencies into bank accounts. Later, accounts were offered in ordinary and several high-yield investment categories.

In 2005 in Bougainville, the U-Vistract system began using bank cards to allow members to purchase goods in "U-Vistract’s Royal International Trade and Commerce System". Merchants were promised reimbursement for member purchases.

 "Based on your bulging balances and bank statements, we will arrange with them a similar transaction program. If you want a car, truck or similar we will make similar arrangements with those who are registered with our system overseas and import your vehicles for you. Once you have decided on your choice we will arrange with suppliers and import them for you", the King said. Similar arrangements can be done for clients wanting housing and building supplies who will pick from different housing designs and once they have made their choice, the U-Vistract system will import these items for them direct from suppliers and warehouses and credit their accounts from the clients' accounts with the RIBM.

Involvement
U-Vistract was a financial lending pyramid scheme into which approximately 60,000 Bougainvilleans invested.

Within a few years, some 70,000 Papua New Guineans had deposited K350 million into U-Vistract alone. U-Vistract also attracted followers in Australia, Solomon Islands and Fiji. In Australia, a small number of Queensland investors contributed some AUD500,000 between July and October 1999… This drew the attention of the Australian Securities and Investments Commission (ASIC), which stopped the further spread of the scheme and required U-Vistract to return the money to its investors (ASIC, 1999).

Initially, U-Vistract had support from the PNG Government, led by Prime Minister Bill Skate. Skate’s Treasurer, Iairo Lasaro, exempted U-Vistract and nine other fast money schemes from the requirements of the Financial Institutions Act. Skate and his Deputy are said to have been large investors in U-Vistract and Money Rain. Many Papua New Guineans believe it was their extravagant investments (of public money) that exhausted the schemes' capacity to pay….;;Musingku defied court orders and continued to operate. He was declared bankrupt (Post- Courier, 15 June 2000) and subsequently charged with contempt of court for continuing to solicit deposits. Musingku attempted to set up another money scheme, the "Royal Reserve Bank of Papala", but police and BPNG officials raided the new pseudo-bank and closed it down. In 2002, Musingku fled to Bougainville and thence to Solomon Islands.''

One U-Vistract official said that "only born-again Christians would be paid" since only they could handle wealth morally.

Present status
In 2010, the International Bank of Me’ekamui, one of Musingku’s bank group, established relations with a group of companies and individuals engaged in commerce outside of the usual financial system. This group has provided billions of dollars in capital to U-Vistract through IBOM, and provided the means for capitalization of the in-ground assets that Bougainville contains, while IBOM has provided access to the international banking system.

A new, gold backed currency is pending issuance. It will be a gold-backed "Kina" (not PNG Kina) worth 1 gm of gold. Currently, the exchange is the UVD at 10 USD to 1 UVD, now at 1 mg gold. This issue will include bills with the likenesses of Muskingku/King David, as well as Jesus Christ.

Notes

References

Sources
 http://www.csrm.uq.edu.au/docs/SSGM_09_05_bainton_cox.pdf

Pyramid and Ponzi schemes
Religious scandals